The 1987 East Coast Conference men's basketball tournament was held March 6–8, 1987.  The champion gained and an automatic berth to the NCAA tournament.

Bracket and results

* denotes overtime game

All-Tournament Team
 Mark Atkinson, Bucknell
 Marty Johnson, Towson State
 Mike Polaha, Lehigh
 Daren Queenan, Lehigh
 Chris Seneca, Bucknell – Tournament MVP

Source

References

East Coast Conference (Division I) men's basketball tournament
Tournament